Mount Pleasant is an unincorporated community in Vinton County, in the U.S. state of Ohio.

History
An old variant name of the community was New Mount Pleasant. New Mount Pleasant had its start around 1832.

Notable people

 Elzy Lay, Hole in the Wall Gang outlaw

References

Unincorporated communities in Vinton County, Ohio
Unincorporated communities in Ohio